Trie-Château is a commune in the Oise department in northern France. On 1 January 2018, the former commune of Villers-sur-Trie was merged into Trie-Château.

See also
 Communes of the Oise department

References

Communes of Oise

Communes nouvelles of Oise